Lindsey Hugh Holliman is a former Democratic member of the North Carolina General Assembly who represented the state's eighty-first House district, including constituents in Davidson County.  A self-employed businessman from Lexington, North Carolina, Holliman served six terms in the state House of Representatives until he was defeated by Republican Rayne Brown in the 2010 general election.

In 2006, Holliman was frequently mentioned as a consensus candidate to replace embattled House Speaker Jim Black. Holliman decided to forgo a run for Speaker, and instead ran for and won the post of House Majority Leader.

External links
Official page
Winston-Salem Journal of Holliman after becoming Majority Leader

|-

|-

Members of the North Carolina House of Representatives
Elon University alumni
Living people
Year of birth missing (living people)
21st-century American politicians